Radical 2 or radical line meaning "vertically connected" is one of 6 of the 214 Kangxi radicals that are composed of only one stroke.

In the Kangxi Dictionary, there are only 21 characters (out of 49,030) to be found under this radical.

 is also the 2nd indexing component in the Table of Indexing Chinese Character Components predominantly adopted by Simplified Chinese dictionaries published in mainland China.

Evolution

Derived characters

In calligraphy

The only stroke in radical line, known as  shù "vertical", is called  nǔ in the eight principles of the character 永 ( Yǒngzì Bāfǎ) which are the basis of Chinese calligraphy.

Literature

References

External links

Unihan Database - U+4E28

002
002